T-cell leukemia describes several different types of lymphoid leukemia which affect T cells.

Types include:
 Large granular lymphocytic leukemia
 Adult T-cell leukemia/lymphoma
 T-cell prolymphocytic leukemia

In practice, it can be hard to distinguish T-cell leukemia from T-cell lymphoma, and they are often grouped together.

References

External links 

Lymphocytic leukemia